Hexathele is a genus of funnel-web spiders endemic to New Zealand that was first described by Anton Ausserer in 1871, though most others have been described by Raymond Robert Forster. Originally placed with the curtain web spiders, it was moved to the Hexathelidae in 1980.

Description
Most species of Hexathele are relatively large spiders. Hexethele species are generally brown to black in colour. Many species have a chevron pattern on the upper surface of the abdomen, the pattern being characteristic of the species. The carapace of the cephalothorax has a more or less straight depression (fovea) in the centre. The eyes are arranged in a compact group. The male palp lacks tibial apophyses (projections), but the male's first pair of legs have double spines on the tibia. There are six spinnerets, with the posterior pair being three-segmented and relatively long.

Taxonomy
The genus was erected by Anton Ausserer in 1871, for the species Hexathele hochstetteri. Mygalomorph spiders were initially very broadly categorized; in 1892, Eugène Simon placed Hexathele in the group Hexatheleae, subfamily Diplurinae, family Aviculariidae. Later the subfamily was raised to the family Dipluridae with Hexathelinae as a subfamily – the classification used by Raymond R. Forster when he described many new species. The subfamily was split off as a full family, Hexathelidae, by Robert J. Raven in 1980.

Species
 it contains twenty species, all found in New Zealand:
Hexathele cantuaria Forster, 1968 – New Zealand
Hexathele cavernicola Forster, 1968 – New Zealand
Hexathele exemplar Parrott, 1960 – New Zealand
Hexathele hochstetteri Ausserer, 1871 (type) – New Zealand
Hexathele huka Forster, 1968 – New Zealand
Hexathele huttoni Hogg, 1908 – New Zealand
Hexathele kohua Forster, 1968 – New Zealand
Hexathele maitaia Forster, 1968 – New Zealand
Hexathele nigra Forster, 1968 – New Zealand
Hexathele otira Forster, 1968 – New Zealand
Hexathele para Forster, 1968 – New Zealand
Hexathele petriei Goyen, 1887 – New Zealand
Hexathele pukea Forster, 1968 – New Zealand
Hexathele putuna Forster, 1968 – New Zealand
Hexathele ramsayi Forster, 1968 – New Zealand
Hexathele rupicola Forster, 1968 – New Zealand
Hexathele taumara Forster, 1968 – New Zealand
Hexathele waipa Forster, 1968 – New Zealand
Hexathele waita Forster, 1968 – New Zealand
Hexathele wiltoni Forster, 1968 – New Zealand

References

Hexathelidae
Mygalomorphae genera
Spiders of New Zealand